ChuChu TV is an Indian network of YouTube channels that creates edutainment content for children. The channel currently has 60 million subscribers, which makes it the 8th most subscribed YouTube channel in India and 22nd globally. ChuChu TV consists of various animated 2D and 3D YouTube videos which are based on either traditional nursery rhymes or original children's songs with the incorporation of peppy or "cool" music targeted at 4- to 6-year-olds.

There are 12 other channels operated by the network which includes: ChuChu TV Hindi, ChuChu TV Bangla and ChuChu TV Telugu, which consists of translated and somewhat re-arranged (with tabla percussion) versions of songs from other ChuChu TV channels, along with ChuChu TV Tamil, where a lot of the channel consists of videos based on Tamil nursery rhymes, ChuChu TV Bedtime Stories and ChuChu TV Surprise Eggs.

History

ChuChu TV's founder, CEO, and director — Vinoth Chandar — posted the channel's first video on YouTube, basing the main character ChuChu on his three-year-old daughter. The first video, titled "Chubby Cheeks", received over three hundred thousand views in two weeks. After the video's success, Chandar decided to invest in his channel and convinced his partners Krishnan, Ajith Togo, Subbiramanian, and Suresh to join the venture. Late in October 2015, another YouTube channel called ChuChu TV Surprise was launched to cater to kids who are 4–6 years old. One-third of ChuChu TV's viewers come from the United States and India. ChuChu TV has about 200 employees.

Merchandising 
In 2016, ChuChu TV announced a partnership with DreamTheatress for the purpose of licensing and merchandising. The merchandise revolves around categories like toys, games, apparel, homeware, and publishing.

Awards

ChuChu TV has since been awarded Ten YouTube "Silver Play Buttons", for gaining over 100,000 subscribers on its channels, six YouTube "Gold Play Buttons", for its channels crossing over 1,000,000 subscribers, and One "Diamond Play Button", for surpassing 10 million subscribers on the channel "ChuChu TV Nursery Rhymes & Songs". The brand has also achieved 'Silver Play Button' for its 9 sub-channels namely: Surprise, Spanish, Portuguese, Funzone, Storytime, French, Hindi, Tamil and Bangla. Also, their Spanish, Portuguese, Surprise, Hindi, Funzone, and Nursery Rhymes channels received a "Gold Play Button".

Apps 
ChuChu TV has its AVOD streaming app "ChuChu TV Lite" on the App Store and Google Play. ChuChu TV launched the Pro version of its app on 13 November 2017. "ChuChu TV Pro" is an SVOD app available on the App Store and Google Play which enables users to download and watch videos offline. The ChuChu TV Pro app also has hundreds of learning activities and games for toddlers.

Other platforms

ChuChu TV is also available on Netflix, YouTube Kids, Roku, and  Amazon Prime Video in India, USA, and UK.

References

2013 establishments in India
English-language mass media in India
Children's mass media
Indian music mass media
YouTube channels
YouTube channels launched in 2013
Indian musical groups